The Airplane Information Management System (AIMS) is the "brains" of Boeing 777 aircraft. It uses four ARINC 629 buses to transfer information. There are 2 cabinets on each plane (left and right).

History
The Intel 80x86 processor was the first to be used for the system, in conjunction with a compiler and runtime system for the Ada programming language. 
Beginning in 1988 and continuing for a number of years, Honeywell Air Transport Systems worked together with consultants from DDC-I in collaboration to retarget and optimize the DDC-I Ada compiler to the AMD 29050 architecture for use in full scale development.   The Airplane Information Management System software would become arguably the best-known of any Ada project, civilian or military. Some 550 developers at Honeywell worked on the flight system.

Functions

Primary Functions

 Cockpit displays system
 Flight management system
 Thrust management system (Autothrottle)
 Aircraft condition monitoring system
 Data communication management (Datalink)
 Flight deck communication
 Central maintenance system
 Flight data acquisition system

Other Functions
 Flight Data Recorder System
 Aircraft Conditioning Monitoring System

See also
 Integrated Modular Avionics (IMA)
 Cockpit display system

References

External links
 Boeing 777 Airplane Information Management System

Avionics